The 2020 Lisboa Belém Open was a professional tennis tournament played on clay courts. It was the fourth edition of the tournament which was part of the 2020 ATP Challenger Tour. It took place in Lisbon, Portugal between 12 and 18 October 2020.

Singles main-draw entrants

Seeds

 1 Rankings are as of 28 September 2020.

Other entrants
The following players received wildcards into the singles main draw:
  Nuno Borges
  Gastão Elias
  Gonçalo Oliveira

The following player received entry into the singles main draw as a special exempt:
  Damir Džumhur

The following players received entry from the qualifying draw:
  Guilherme Clezar
  Borna Gojo
  Dimitar Kuzmanov
  Sebastian Ofner

Champions

Singles

 Jaume Munar def.  Pedro Sousa 7–6(7–3), 6–2.

Doubles

 Roberto Cid Subervi /  Gonçalo Oliveira def.  Harri Heliövaara /  Zdeněk Kolář 7–6(7–5), 4–6, [10–4].

References

Lisboa Belém Open
2020
2020 in Portuguese tennis
October 2020 sports events in Portugal
2020 Lisboa Belém Open